The doctrine of implied repeal is a concept in constitutional theory which states that where an Act of Parliament or an Act of Congress (or of some other legislature) conflicts with an earlier one, the later Act takes precedence and the conflicting parts of the earlier Act become legally inoperable. This doctrine is expressed in the Latin phrase leges posteriores priores contrarias abrogant or "lex posterior derogat priori".

Implied repeal is to be contrasted with the express repeal of legislation by the legislative body.

Canada 

In Canadian law, it is possible for a law to be protected from implied repeal by way of a "primacy clause" which states that the act in question supersedes all other statutes until it is specifically repealed.  Acts with such primacy clauses are called quasi-constitutional.

United Kingdom 
In the 2002 English case Thoburn v Sunderland City Council (the so-called "Metric Martyrs" case), Lord Justice Laws held that some constitutionally significant statutes hold a higher status in UK law and are not subject to the doctrine of implied repeal. The case specifically dealt with s.2(2) of the European Communities Act, but in his judgment Lord Justice Laws also held the view that the Parliament Acts and the Human Rights Act are "constitutional statutes" and in his opinion may not be subject to the doctrine of implied repeal. 

A decade later in 2012, in a case before the United Kingdom Supreme Court, BH v The Lord Advocate (Scotland), Lord Hope held that "the Scotland Act can only be expressly repealed; it cannot be impliedly repealed; that is because of its 'fundamental constitutional nature'."

United States
Under United States law, "implied repeal" is a disfavored doctrine.  That is, if a court can reconcile the two statutes with any reasonable interpretation, that interpretation is preferred to one that treats the earlier statute as invalidated by the later one.

See also
Desuetude
Derogation
Obrogation

References 

English legal terminology
Legal doctrines and principles